Zhongshan County is a county in the northeast of Guangxi, China. It is under the administration of the prefecture-level city of Hezhou.

Climate

References

Counties of Guangxi
Administrative divisions of Hezhou